The Jeffersonville Bridge is a steel girder bridge carrying Vermont Route 108 across the Lamoille River, just north of the village of Jeffersonville, Vermont. It was built in 2014, replacing a Parker through truss bridge built in 1931; the latter bridge was listed on the National Register of Historic Places in 1991.

Setting
The bridge is set just north of Jeffersonville, and carries Vermont Route 108 across the Lamoille River, providing access to Bakersfield via Vermont Route 108 and Waterville via Vermont Route 109. On the south side of the bridge it is connected to a rotary forming the junction of Vermont Route 108 and Vermont Route 15, which runs generally east-west parallel to the river.

Historic bridge
The 1931 Jeffersonville Bridge was a Parker through truss structure, with steel girder approaches at both ends. It had a deck of concrete laid on steel I-beam stringers. The bridge was built in 1931 by the American Bridge Company, and was built using standards and practices adopted by the state after its devastating 1927 floods. Although the bridge rebuilding program after that flood formally ended in 1930, this bridge was built applying the same principles for selection of bridge type (based on the length of the span) and construction practices. The bridge was replaced in 2014 by the present structure.

See also

National Register of Historic Places listings in Lamoille County, Vermont
List of bridges documented by the Historic American Engineering Record in Vermont
List of bridges on the National Register of Historic Places in Vermont

References

External links

Bridges on the National Register of Historic Places in Vermont
National Register of Historic Places in Lamoille County, Vermont
Bridges completed in 1931
Bridges completed in 2014
Bridges in Lamoille County, Vermont
Buildings and structures in Cambridge, Vermont
Demolished buildings and structures in Vermont
Steel bridges in the United States
Girder bridges in the United States
Historic American Engineering Record in Vermont
Parker truss bridges in the United States
Road bridges in Vermont
1931 establishments in Vermont
2014 establishments in Vermont